James Dugdale was an Oxford academic and administrator. He was Fellow and Master of University College, Oxford.

In 1547, Dugdale become a Fellow of University College. He was Master from 1558, but only for a short period, since he refused to support Queen Elizabeth I with the Oath of Supremacy. On 17 November 1561, he was summoned to appear in front of the Royal Visitors, failed to appear, and thus lost his Mastership of University College. Thomas Caius was elected Master later on the same day.

Dugdale had been collated Archdeacon of St Albans in 1557 but was deprived of the Archdeaconry in 1560 because of his Catholic sympathies and failure to sign the Oath of Supremacy.

References

Year of birth missing
Year of death missing
16th-century English educators
Archdeacons of St Albans
Fellows of University College, Oxford
Masters of University College, Oxford